Vektor is an American technical thrash metal band from Tempe, Arizona (and based in Philadelphia since 2012). Their music is heavily themed around scientific, philosophical, futuristic and astronomical topics.

History

Formation and first albums (2002–2011) 
The band was formed under the name Locrian in December 2002 by the front man/guitarist David DiSanto, and a year later they released their first demo, "Nucleus". After reforming the band in 2004 under the name Vektor, they became popular in the Phoenix metal scene, with a musical style that mixes technical thrash metal and speed metal with progressive influences. In 2006, Vektor released a demo entitled "Demolition", followed by a two track demo "Hunger for Violence" (2007). After four years of local and regional performances as the opening act for such national acts as Testament, Hirax, Iced Earth and Municipal Waste, Vektor embarked on a tour, alongside label mates Exmortus, in support of Black Future in December 2009 through January 2010. The band subsequently toured the US in June–August 2010 on their own. Their first full-length album, Black Future, was released on November 17, 2009, on Heavy Artillery Records. The band released its second album, Outer Isolation, on November 22, 2011, on the Heavy Artillery label. In 2012, the band signed with Earache Records after the label acquired Heavy Artillery's roster of artists.

Touring, Terminal Redux, and hiatus (2012–2016) 

In the summer of 2012 Vektor went on a small headlining tour, and in November opened on an extended tour with Napalm Death, Municipal Waste and Exhumed. In January 2013, the band played the Earache Records Showcase in California.

The band played their first European show at Hellfest in June 2013. They embarked on their first full European headlining tour in November and December 2015 alongside Angelus Apatrida and Distillator which included an appearance at Eindhoven Metal Meeting and culminated in a show at the Camden Underworld in London. In early 2016, the band embarked on an American tour opening for Voivod. After the band's relocation to Philadelphia and several years of touring, their third album, Terminal Redux, a conceptual work with a runtime of over 70 minutes, was released on May 6, 2016.

In December 2016, guitarist Erik Nelson, bassist Frank Chin and drummer Blake Anderson left the band, thus putting the band into hiatus, stating that there was "no big story or drama," but "people and personalities simply change and drift apart and we've reached our limit."

Reformation with new lineup and split EP with Cryptosis (2020–present) 
In May 2020, DiSanto and Erik Nelson announced they were reforming Vektor, with Mike Ohlson on drums and Stephen Coon on bass, and that they were working on new material and preparing for multiple tour dates in 2021. On December 16, 2020, Vektor released their first song in four years, "Activate", taken from the upcoming split EP with Cryptosis, Transmissions of Chaos.

Band members 
Current members
David DiSanto – vocals, lead and rhythm guitar (2002–present)
Erik Nelson – lead and rhythm guitar (2004–2016, 2020–present)
Stephen Coon – bass guitar (2020–present)
Mike Ohlson – drums (2020–present)

Former members
Mike Tozzi – bass guitar (2006–2008)
Adam Anderson – drums (2004–2007)
Kian Ahmad – drums (2007)
Frank Chin – bass guitar (2008–2016)
Blake Anderson – drums (2007–2016)
Timeline

Discography

Studio albums 
Black Future (2009)
Outer Isolation (2011)
Terminal Redux (2016)

Demos 
Nucleus (as Locrian) (2004)
Demolition (2006)
Hunger for Violence/Accelerating Universe (2007)

Singles 
"Scion AV Label Showcase – Earache Records" (2013)
"Ultimate Artificer" (2015)
"Charging the Void" (2016)
"Pillars of Sand" (2016)
"Activate" (2020)

EPs 
Transmissions of Chaos (2021) (split with Cryptosis)

References

External links 

Musical groups established in 2002
Musical groups reestablished in 2020
American thrash metal musical groups
Musical groups disestablished in 2016
2002 establishments in Arizona